Deal or No Deal Canada is the Canadian-English version of the show Deal or No Deal, which premiered  on February 4, 2007. The show ran on the Global Television Network, and lasted five episodes.

The host of the U.S. version, Canadian-born Howie Mandel, hosts the Canadian version of the show. The producer and director of the United States version, Scott St. John and R. Brian DiPirro, respectively, also went to Canada to produce this version.

The show was taped at the Canadian Broadcasting Centre in Toronto on January 23, 24, and 25, 2007 after receiving 112,767 applicants from prospective players.

The first episode aired on Sunday, February 4, 2007. This episode attracted 2.7 million viewers, making it the single highest-rated Canadian program ever on Global. The remaining episodes aired over the following four consecutive Thursdays, with the finale on March 1, 2007.

Despite the show's success in its brief five-episode run, Global never picked up the show for a full-season run.

Case values
The amounts remain the same as the American edition, except for the re-labeling of the $1 value using the common nickname "Loonie", the addition of a "Toonie", the $2 case, and the removal of the $400,000 value. All amounts are in Canadian dollars, (tax-free).

Canada's Case Game

Presented by ET Canada correspondent Rick Campanelli, Canada's Case Game is modeled after the American Lucky Case Game. During commercials, five cases are displayed by a selection of the models. Viewers are invited to choose a case by texting the Deal or No Deal number, (at a cost of $1 per message) or entering the Global TV website, with the winning case displayed at the end of the program. All those who selected the winning case was entered in the draw for a grand prize.

However, the prize in the Case Game is not cash; prizes that were offered included a Pontiac G6 convertible (in connection with Pontiac's sponsorship of the show) and trips for 12 from Sunquest Vacations.

In the first episode, entry volume was so high that the contest had to be extended one hour.

Winners of Canada's Case Game are revealed the following evening on ET Canada.

Sponsors and cross-placement
In addition to Pontiac, Rogers is also a main sponsor of Deal or No Deal Canada. The red-coloured telephone on the show is product placement for Rogers.

See also
 Le Banquier

References

External links
 Official Website (via Internet Archive)

2007 Canadian television series debuts
2007 Canadian television series endings
2000s Canadian game shows
Deal or No Deal
Global Television Network original programming
Television shows filmed in Toronto
Television series by Corus Entertainment
Canadian television series based on Dutch television series